Goddanti Ranga Rao (Telugu: గొద్దంటి రంగారావు) is an Indian who served as the Director of the Bharat Scouts and Guides.
In 1994, Ranga Rao was awarded the 238th Bronze Wolf, the only distinction of the World Organization of the Scout Movement, awarded by the World Scout Committee for exceptional services to world Scouting.

References

External links

Recipients of the Bronze Wolf Award
Year of birth missing
Scouting and Guiding in India